Cryptocranium cazieri is a species of beetle in the family Cerambycidae. It was described by Lane in 1958. It is known from Peru and Brazil.

References

Pteropliini
Beetles described in 1958